Trimethylsulfoxonium iodide is a sulfoxonium salt. It is used to generate dimethyloxosulfonium methylide by reaction with sodium hydride. The latter compound is used as a methylene-transfer reagent, and is used to prepare epoxides.

This compound is commercially available. It may be prepared by the reaction of dimethyl sulfoxide and iodomethane:

 (CH3)2SO + CH3I → (CH3)3SO+I−

References

Organosulfur compounds
Iodides
Reagents for organic chemistry